Sword of the Valiant: The Legend of Sir Gawain and the Green Knight (often shortened to Sword of the Valiant) is a 1984 dramatic fantasy film directed by Stephen Weeks and starring Miles O'Keeffe, Trevor Howard, Lila Kedrova, Cyrielle Clair, Leigh Lawson, Peter Cushing, and Sean Connery. The film is loosely based on the poem Sir Gawain and the Green Knight, written in the late 14th century, but the narrative differs substantially. It was the second time Weeks had adapted the traditional tale into a film. His first effort was Gawain and the Green Knight (1973).

Plot
In a castle's great hall during Yuletide, King Arthur halts a feast as he feels ashamed of how lax he and his knights have become during times of peace, questioning the bravery of all knights present. Suddenly, an ax-wielding knight in green armor arrives at the castle, challenging the knights to a game - he challenges them to decapitate him in one swing of his ax, with the caveat that he can return the blow. None of the knights volunteer, leading the king to shame them for their lack of courage, and accept the challenge himself. Finally, Gawain, a young squire, accepts the challenge in lieu of the king, and is swiftly knighted. Gawain beheads the knight, but the body of the decapitated knight picks up his head and returns it to his neck. Gawain kneels for the knight to strike him, but the Green Knight refuses due to his youth. Promising to return in one year to claim his side of the bargain, the Green Knight gives Gawain a chance to solve a riddle to save his life, which consists of four lines:

 Where life is emptiness, gladness.
 Where life is darkness, fire.
 Where life is golden, sorrow.
 Where life is lost, wisdom.

With King Arthur's blessing, Gawain leaves with Humphrey, a squire, in search of the answer to the Green Knight's riddle. Morgan le Fay instructs Gawain to blow a horn near the seashore, and to go to the lost city of Lyonesse. Upon blowing the horn, a knight in black armor reveals himself to be the guardian of Lyonesse, and challenges Gawain to a duel. Despite the guardian knight's dishonorable conduct in the duel, Gawain wins, and the guardian, dying, asks to be brought home to Lyonesse. Gawain rides to Lyonesse with the guardian, and Humphrey gets separated from Gawain. Upon entering Lyonesse, the guardian knight, on his deathbed, accuses Gawain of murdering him. Pursued by the city guard, Gawain escapes with the help of Linet, a beautiful maiden who gives him her ring, which makes him invisible. Gawain falls in love with Linet, and attempts to escape the city with her, but he manages to leave the city while she is captured. While held by the guards, Linet quickly gives her ring to Gawain. Abruptly appearing in an empty field, he is told by the Green Knight that the game he accepted as a challenge has rules, rules of which have been broken by meeting Linet at the wrong time, and taking her ring. Encountering a group of monks, Gawain asks Vosper, a friar and former thief, for help with the green knight's riddle; Vosper tells Gawain to see the sage at the rock of wisdom.

Gawain agrees to follow the rules of the game, and is transported to Lyonesse by the sage, only to find the city decrepit, the denizens old and covered in cobwebs, frozen in time. Gawain carries the frozen Linet to a small house outside of the city, and revives her and restores her youth using her ring. Gawain encounters Humphrey, but while away from the house, Linet is kidnapped by the lustful prince Oswald and the army of his father, the warmongering Baron Fortinbras. Seeking to save Linet, Gawain and Humphrey sneak into the Baron's castle by blending in with a group of prisoners being transported to the castle. Gawain rallies the prisoners to help escape the castle and rescue Linet, but while the rescue mission is underway, Sir Bertilak, a rival of Baron Fortinbras, arrives and threatens Fortinbras with war if certain demands are not met. While the prisoners escape, the rescue fails when a fire breaks out in Linet's prison, leading Gawain to believe she's dead. Mournful, Gawain leaves Humphrey and the escaped prisoners, wandering aimlessly until he stumbles across the castle of Sir Bertilak. Sir Bertilak allows Gawain to rest and recover in his castle. Linet is alive, having been accepted by Bertilak as a tribute from Baron Fortinbras to prevent war. Linet gives Gawain a green sash, and tells him that no harm will befall him while he wears it.

The year given by the Green Knight comes to an end, and Gawain, meeting with Humphrey and the former prisoners, goes out seeking the knight. Gawain is attacked by Oswald and Baron Fortinbras's army, and Oswald challenges Gawain to a duel with his champion. After defeating several of Oswald's champions, Oswald himself fights Gawain while the former prisoners fight his army. Gawain wins the duel, and the army retreats. Following his fight with the prince, Gawain is approached by the Green Knight. Gawain has failed to solve the final line of the riddle within the time limit, and must allow the Green Knight one swing at his neck with an ax. The Green Knight strikes Gawain, but he is unharmed due to the sash given to him by Linet. The Green Knight and Sir Gawain duel, and as the Green Knight suffers a mortal wound, he asks Sir Gawain to stop the battle, realizing that he has already lost.

Sir Gawain returns to Linet, who tells him that she must return to Lyonesse alone. As he touches her cheek, she transforms into a dove, and flies away.

Cast
 Miles O'Keeffe as Sir Gawain  
 Cyrielle Clair as Linet 
 Leigh Lawson as Humphrey  
 Sean Connery as The Green Knight  
 Trevor Howard as King Arthur 
 Peter Cushing as Seneschal - Gaspar  
 Ronald Lacey as Oswald  
 Lila Kedrova as Lady of Lyonesse  
 John Rhys-Davies as Baron Fortinbras  
 Wilfrid Brambell as Porter  
 Bruce Lidington as Sir Bertilak  
 Douglas Wilmer as The Black Knight  
 Brian Coburn as Friar Vosper  
 David Rappaport as Sage  
 Emma Sutton as Morgan Le Fay

Production
The film was copyrighted in 1983 and released the following year. Filming took place in Wales and Ireland, as well as the Château de Pierrefonds and the Palais des Papes in France. The period wardrobe was culled from the collections of stock rooms of the Royal National Theatre and the Bristol Old Vic as well as Berman's and Nathan's, the French Aristide Boyer and the Spanish Cornejo.

Director Stephen Weeks hoped to cast Mark Hamill as Gawain, but producers Menahem Golan and Yoram Globus insisted on Miles O'Keeffe for the role. The film also stars Emma Sutton who would later appear in another film about the Arthurian legends, Merlin of the Crystal Cave.

Steptoe and Son actor Wilfrid Brambell made a guest appearance. This was his last performance.

The current USA DVD release has received negative reviews as it is mastered in a 4:3 pan and scan picture.  However, the Polish release has the film in the original 2.35:1 Cinemascope ratio which has proved more popular.  This film is currently unreleased in the United Kingdom.  The film received a Blu-ray release in the United States on October 14, 2020 by Scorpion Releasing.

Reception
Reviewing the film, Time Out London magazine gave it a negative review. It described Sword of the Valiant as "underwhelming" and added "Dreary jousting, production values that make Monty Python and the Holy Grail look lavish, and an excruciating synthesizer score make this a real trial." On Metacritic the film has a weighted average score of 12 out of 100, based on 4 critics, indicating "Overwhelming dislike".

See also
List of films based on Arthurian legend

References

External links
 
 

1984 films
1980s historical fantasy films
British historical fantasy films
Arthurian films
Films based on poems
Films set in castles
Films shot in France
Films shot in Ireland
Films shot in Wales
Golan-Globus films
Sword and sorcery films
Films produced by Menahem Golan
Films produced by Yoram Globus
1980s English-language films
Films directed by Stephen Weeks
1980s British films